Antônio Monteiro Dutra (born August 11, 1973), or simply Dutra, is a Brazilian left back.

Club statistics

Honours
Santos
Torneio Rio-São Paulo: 1997

Coritiba
Campeonato Paranaense: 1999

Yokohama F. Marinos
J.League Cup: 2001
J1 League : 2003, 2004
Emperor's Cup: 2013

Sport
Campeonato Pernambucano: 2007, 2008, 2009, 2010
Copa do Brasil: 2008

Santa Cruz
Campeonato Pernambucano: 2012

Individual
J.League Best XI: 2003, 2004

References

External links

zerozero.pt 

1973 births
América Futebol Clube (MG) players
Brazilian footballers
Brazilian expatriate footballers
Coritiba Foot Ball Club players
Living people
Mogi Mirim Esporte Clube players
Paysandu Sport Club players
Santos FC players
Sport Club do Recife players
Santa Cruz Futebol Clube players
Yokohama F. Marinos players
Expatriate footballers in Japan
J1 League players
Association football fullbacks